The Palamós to Flaçà, Girona and Banyoles Railway was a  gauge railway line that operated over  of track between Palamós, Girona and Banyoles, in the province of Girona, Catalonia, Spain. The line was promoted by the Tranvía del Bajo Ampurdán company.

From its opening, the railway had a connection with the Iberian gauge Barcelona–Cerbère railway at Flaçà, and provided the only rail connection to the port at Palamós and the inland towns of Palafrugell and La Bisbal. The trains transported passengers and freight, especially cork, which was exported from nearby plantations to destinations in France and beyond.

In 1905, the line was purchased by the Belgian owned Ferrocarriles Económicos de Cataluña company. The Girona terminus, at Porta de França, was some distance from the city's main line station and the termini of the city's two other narrow gauge railways, the Sant Feliu de Guíxols–Girona railway and the Olot–Girona railway.

In 1923, the railway line changed hands again, being acquired by the Ferrocarriles Económicos Españoles.

The line was badly damaged during the Spanish Civil War, and in 1941 it was taken over by the state owned organisation . The line was reopened in 1942, after the war time damage had been repaired, but it closed for good in 1956.

Part of the line between Palamós and Palafrugell has been converted into a greenway. Outside the building a platform and short stretch of roadside track has been reconstructed, and a replica of one of the line's passenger cars is displayed.

Gallery

References 

750 mm gauge railways in Spain
Railway lines in Catalonia
Railway lines opened in 1887
Transport in Gironès
Transport in Baix Empordà